Alfred Edwin Beilhartz was a young boy who vanished in 1938 at Rocky Mountain National Park, Colorado.

Disappearance and search
Alfred was on vacation with his family, in the course of which they all went to Estes Park to fish. While hiking with his parents on a trail that ran along a creek, Alfred fell behind and vanished. Once the family could not locate Alfred after conducting a search they called in park rangers who, believing he may have drowned in the creek, dammed it and dragged the creek for his body but found nothing. Searchers then concentrated on a land search and bloodhounds were called in but again this proved fruitless and the search was called off after ten days.

Possible sightings
Hikers in a different part of the park claimed that they saw a small boy on an elevation called Devils Nest on Mt. Chapin, while walking along Old Fall Road. According to the sighting, the boy sat on the edge of the elevation for several minutes before being jerked back by someone off to the side. The identity of this person has never been established.  The hikers contacted park officials who sent climbers to search the clifftop but they found nothing. The search party included 150 men and members of the Civilian Conservation Corps.
Some time later Alfred was supposedly sighted walking along a road with a man in Nebraska.

Aftermath
A bandage found in an abandoned cabin was tested, since the child had a similar one when he vanished. A ransom note for $500 was sent to the parents after Alfred had been missing for five months, however police determined it to be a hoax. Alfred's father believed that Alfred had been abducted but was still alive.

See also
List of people who disappeared

References

External links 

Missing American children
1930s missing person cases
1938 in Colorado
Missing person cases in Colorado
People from Denver
Rocky Mountain National Park